The 1894 William & Mary football team represented the College of William & Mary during the 1894 college football season. In their only game of the 1894 season, Hampden–Sydney beat the then-unnicknamed William & Mary for their football program's first ever win.

Schedule

References

William and Mary
William & Mary Tribe football seasons
College football winless seasons
William and Mary football